Erdal Özyağcılar (born 4 August 1948) is a Turkish actor. He has appeared in films, on the stage and on television.

Biography 
Özyağcılar was born in 1948 in Bursa. He started his acting career in 1967, with the movie "Ölüm Tarlası" (Field of Death). He is a theater artist as well as a screen actor, who had roles in many plays, movies and TV series. He also appeared in TV commercials.

Özyağcılar is a popular character in the TV series Yabancı Damat, which is famous both in Turkey and Greece.

The artist regained his popularity in Turkey in 2007 with the series named Elveda Rumeli (Farewell Rumelia), portraying a Turkish peasant living during the turmoil times of 19th century in Balkans region, near Monastir, with his family, when Ottoman Empire started to lose territory and fall back.

He is married to Güzin Özyağcılar, also a theater actress.

Filmography

TV series 
 Bizimkiler, 1989, as Şükrü
 Şehnaz Tango, 1994, as Muhsin
 Altın Kafes, 2004, as Cevher Kehribar
 Yabancı Damat, 2004–2007, as Kahraman
 Elveda Rumeli, 2007–2009, as Ramiz
 Karadağlar, 2010–2011, as Halit Karadağ
 İki Yaka Bir İsmail, 2011
 Sevdaluk, 2013
 Gülümse Yeter, 2016–2017, as Hasan Civan
 No 309, 2017, as Yıldırım Yenilmez
 Şampiyon, 2019–2020, as Yaman Günaltay
 Yasak Elma, 2020–2021, as Hasan Ali Kuyucu
 Balkan Ninnisi, 2022–2023, as Süleyman

Movies 
 Balatlı Arif (1967)
 Çöpçüler Kralı (1977)
 Ya Ya Ya Şa Şa Şa (1985)
 Beyoğlu'nun Arka Yakası
 Aah Güzel İstanbul
 Züğürt Ağa
 Kibar Feyzo
 Şabaniye
 Namuslu
 Aşık Oldum (1985)
 Postacı
 Aile Arasında (2017)
 Mucize 2: Aşk (2019)
 Müstakbel Damat (2020)
 Aynasız Haluk (2022)
 Sivaslıyıh Gardaş (2022)
 Güven Bana (2023)
 Prestij Meselesi (2023)

References 
 Biyografi.net - Biography of Erdal Özyağcılar

External links 

Living people
1948 births
People from Bursa
Turkish male film actors
Best Supporting Actor Golden Orange Award winners
Turkish male television actors